System L is a natural deductive logic developed by E.J. Lemmon. Derived from Suppes' method, it represents natural deduction proofs as sequences of justified steps. Both methods are derived from Gentzen's 1934/1935 natural deduction system, in which proofs were presented in tree-diagram form rather than in the tabular form of Suppes and Lemmon. Although the tree-diagram layout has advantages for philosophical and educational purposes, the tabular layout is much more convenient for practical applications.

A similar tabular layout is presented by Kleene. The main difference is that Kleene does not abbreviate the left-hand sides of assertions to line numbers, preferring instead to either give full lists of precedent propositions or alternatively indicate the left-hand sides by bars running down the left of the table to indicate dependencies. However, Kleene's version has the advantage that it is presented, although only very sketchily, within a rigorous framework of metamathematical theory, whereas the books by Suppes and Lemmon are applications of the tabular layout for teaching introductory logic.

Description of the deductive system 

System L is a predicate calculus with equality, so its description can be separated into two parts: the general proof syntax and the context specific rules.

General Proof Syntax 
A proof is a table with 4 columns and unlimited ordered rows. From left to right the columns hold:

 A set of positive integers, possibly empty
 A positive integer
 A well-formed formula (or wff)
 A set of numbers, possibly empty; a rule; and possibly a reference to another proof
The following is an example:

The second column holds line numbers. The third holds a wff, which is justified by the rule held in the fourth along with auxiliary information about other wffs, possibly in other proofs. The first column represents the line numbers of the assumptions the wff rests on, determined by the application of the cited rule in context. Any line of any valid proof can be converted into a sequent by listing the wffs at the cited lines as the premises and the wff at the line as the conclusion. Analogously, they can be converted into conditionals where the antecedent is a conjunction. These sequents are often listed above the proof, as Modus Tollens is above.

Rules of Predicate Calculus with Equality 
The above proof is a valid one, but proofs don't need to be to conform to the general syntax of the proof system. To guarantee a sequent's validity, however, we must conform to carefully specified rules. The rules can be divided into four groups: the propositional rules (1-10), the predicate rules (11-14), the rules of equality (15-16), and the rule of substitution (17). Adding these groups in order allows one to build a propositional calculus, then a predicate calculus, then a predicate calculus with equality, then a predicate calculus with equality allowing for the derivation of new rules. Some of the propositional calculus rules, like MTT, are superfluous and can be derived as rules from other rules.
 The Rule of Assumption (A): "A" justifies any wff. The only assumption is its own line number.
 Modus Ponendo Ponens (MPP): If there are lines a and b previously in the proof containing P→Q and P respectively, "a,b MPP" justifies Q. The assumptions are the collective pool of lines a and b.
The Rule of Conditional Proof (CP): If a line with proposition P has an assumption line b with proposition Q, "b,a CP" justifies Q→P. All of a's assumptions aside b are kept.
The Rule of Double Negation (DN): "a DN" justifies adding or subtracting two negation symbols from the wff at a line a previously in the proof, making this rule a biconditional. The assumption pool is the one of the line cited.
 The Rule of ∧-introduction (∧I): If propositions P and Q are at lines a and b, "a,b ∧I" justifies P∧Q. The assumptions are the collective pool of the conjoined propositions.
 The Rule of ∧-elimination (∧E): If line a is a conjunction P∧Q, one can conclude either P or Q using "a ∧E". The assumptions are line a's. ∧I and ∧E allow for monotonicity of entailment, as when a proposition P is joined with Q with ∧I and separated with ∧E, it retains Q's assumptions.
 The Rule of ∨-introduction (∨I): For a line a with proposition P one can introduce P∨Q citing "a ∨I". The assumptions are a's.
 The Rule of ∨-elimination (∨E): For a disjunction P∨Q, if one assumes P and Q and separately comes to the conclusion R from each, then one can conclude R. The rule is cited as "a,b,c,d,e ∨E", where line a has the initial disjunction P∨Q, lines b and d assume P and Q respectively, and lines c and e are R with P and Q in their respective assumption pools. The assumptions are the collective pools of the two lines concluding R minus the lines of P and Q, b and d.
 Reductio Ad Absurdum (RAA): For a proposition P∧¬P on line a citing an assumption Q on line b, one can cite "b,a RAA" and derive ¬Q from the assumptions of line a aside from b.
Modus Tollens (MTT): For propositions P→Q and ¬Q on lines a and b one can cite "a,b MTT" to derive ¬P. The assumptions are those of lines a and b. This is proven from other rules above.
Universal Introduction (UI): For a predicate  on line a, one can cite "a UI" to justify a universal quantification,, provided none of the assumptions on line a have the term  in anywhere. The assumptions are those of line a.
Universal Elimination (UE): For a universally quantified predicate  on line a, one can cite "a UE" to justify . The assumptions are those of line a. UE is a duality with UI in that one can switch between quantified and free variables using these rules.
Existential Introduction (EI): For a predicate  on line a one can cite "a EI" to justify an existential quantification, . The assumptions are those of line a.
Existential Elimination (EE): For an existentially quantified predicate  on line a, if we assume  to be true on line b and derive P with it on line c, we can cite "a,b,c EE" to justify P. The term  cannot appear in the conclusion P, any of its assumptions aside from line b, or on line a. The assumptions are the assumptions on line a and any on line c aside from b.
Equality Introduction (=I): At any point one can introduce  citing "=I" with no assumptions.
The assumptions are the pool of a and b.
The assumptions are those of lines a and b. A derived rule with no assumptions is a theorem, and can be introduced at any time with no assumptions. Some cite that as "TI(S)", for "theorem" instead of "sequent". Additionally, some cite only "SI" or "TI" in either case when a substitution instance isn't needed, as their propositions match the ones of the referenced proof exactly.

Examples 
An example of the proof of a sequent (a theorem in this case):

A proof of the principle of explosion using monotonicity of entailment. Some have called the following technique, demonstrated in lines 3-6, the Rule of (Finite) Augmentation of Premises:

An example of substitution and ∨E:

History of tabular natural deduction systems 

The historical development of tabular-layout natural deduction systems, which are rule-based, and which indicate antecedent propositions by line numbers (and related methods such as vertical bars or asterisks) includes the following publications.

 1940: In a textbook, Quine indicated antecedent dependencies by line numbers in square brackets, anticipating Suppes' 1957 line-number notation. 
 1950: In a textbook,  demonstrated a method of using one or more asterisks to the left of each line of proof to indicate dependencies. This is equivalent to Kleene's vertical bars. (It is not totally clear if Quine's asterisk notation appeared in the original 1950 edition or was added in a later edition.)
This indicated dependencies (i.e. antecedent propositions) by line numbers at the left of each line.
 1963:  uses sets of line numbers to indicate antecedent dependencies of the lines of sequential logical arguments based on natural deduction inference rules.
 1967: In a textbook,  briefly demonstrated two kinds of practical logic proofs, one system using explicit quotations of antecedent propositions on the left of each line, the other system using vertical bar-lines on the left to indicate dependencies.

See also 
 Natural deduction
 Sequent calculus
 Deductive systems

Notes

References
   (English translation Investigations into Logical Deduction in Szabo.)

External links
 Pelletier, Jeff, "A History of Natural Deduction and Elementary Logic Textbooks."

Propositional calculus